The Chestnut Street Bridge is a bridge across the Schuylkill River that carries Chestnut Street in Philadelphia, Pennsylvania.  The original 1861 bridge was "a bridge whose scale and use of cast iron made it singular in the United States and throughout the world".  The 1957 bridge, now one way, helps connect West Philadelphia with the rest of the city.

History 
Construction of the first Chestnut Street Bridge, designed by Strickland Kneass, started on 4 September 1861.  That bridge cost $500,000, was 1,528 feet (466 m) long, and was constructed of cast iron, with approaches and piers of granite.  When the bridge formally opened on 23 June 1866, it was the second connection between Center City, Philadelphia and West Philadelphia, after the Market Street Bridge.

In 1957, to make way for the Schuylkill Expressway, the western pier of the bridge was removed, and the main spans of the bridge were replaced.

In 2011, a weight restriction was placed on it due to its age.

In August, 2019, the bridge was closed to vehicles and pedestrians for one year to repair the steel superstructure and replace the deck, but has been extended due to COVID-19 until March 19, 2022.

In film 
 In the 2007 film Shooter, FBI agent Nick Memphis (played by Michael Peña) is abducted while walking across the Chestnut Street Bridge.
 One episode of Hack was filmed on the bridge.

See also 
List of crossings of the Schuylkill River

References

External links 
 1869 photo of the bridge

The Chestnut Street Bridge, Philadelphia, July 28, 1865, by D. J. Kennedy, Historical Society of Philadelphia 

Bridges over the Schuylkill River
Bridges completed in 1957
Bridges in Philadelphia
Historic American Buildings Survey in Philadelphia
Road bridges in Pennsylvania
Steel bridges in the United States